Suleybakent is a rural locality (a selo) in Karlabkinsky Selsoviet, Levashinsky District, Republic of Dagestan, Russia. The population was 1,257 as of 2010. There are 11 streets.

Geography 
Suleybakent is located 12 km southeast of Levashi (the district's administrative centre) by road. Tagirkent and Tagzirkent are the nearest rural localities.

Nationalities 
Dargins live there.

References 

Rural localities in Levashinsky District